Gian Luca Waldschmidt (born 19 May 1996) is a German professional footballer who plays as a forward for Bundesliga club VfL Wolfsburg and the Germany national team. He developed through the academy of Eintracht Frankfurt and has represented Germany at various levels.

Club career

Eintracht Frankfurt
A forward, Waldschmidt began his youth career in 2001 with SSV Oranien Frohnhausen and had youth spells at SSC Juno Burg and TSG Wieseck before joining the Eintracht Frankfurt academy in 2010.

On 25 April 2014, Waldschmidt signed his first professional contract, a three-year deal. This saw him promoted to the first team, although he would still appear for the under-19 team. Exactly one year later, on 25 April 2015, Waldschmidt made his Bundesliga debut, as a 73rd-minute substitute for Sonny Kittel in a 0–2 home loss to Borussia Dortmund. He scored his first goal for Eintracht Frankfurt on 8 August in a 3–0 win over Bremer SV in the first round of the German cup.

Hamburger SV
On 30 June 2016, Waldschmidt signed for Hamburger SV on a four-year contract.  He made his first appearance for the Hamburg club in the Bundesliga in a 0–4 home loss to RB Leipzig on 17 September, coming on as a substitute in the 83rd minute, replacing Bobby Wood. He scored his first goal for the club a few seconds after coming on, in a 4–0 win over Hallescher FC on 24 October, in a second-round cup fixture. On 20 May 2017, the last round of the 2016–17 Bundesliga season, Waldschmidt scored his first Bundesliga-goal, the decisive goal in a 2–1 win over relegation rivals VfL Wolfsburg, in the 88th minute - two minutes after being substituted in. The goal meant that Hamburger SV avoided Bundesliga relegation play-offs for the first time in four years. In the following season, Waldschmidt made 21 league appearances in which he scored one goal. At the end of the season, Hamburger SV were relegated to the 2. Bundesliga for the first time in the Bundesliga's 55-year history.

SC Freiburg
In May 2018, SC Freiburg announced they had signed Waldschmidt for the 2018–19 season from Hamburger SV, newly relegated to the 2. Bundesliga. The club reportedly triggered a €5 million release clause. He finished his first campaign for the club with 30 appearances and nine goals.

Benfica
On 14 August 2020, Benfica announced the signing of Waldschmidt on a five-year deal for 15 million euros. Waldschmidt scored twice on his Benfica debut, a 5–1 Primeira Liga win over Famalicão on 18 September 2020.

VfL Wolfsburg
On 22 August 2021, Waldschmidt returned to Germany, signing a four-year contract with VfL Wolfsburg.

International career
Waldschmidt has represented the Germany national youth football team at U16, U17, U18, U19 and U21 level. He finished as the top scorer of the 2019 UEFA European Under-21 Championship, where he scored seven goals, breaking the previous record of his compatriot, Pierre Littbarski, who scored six goals in the 1982 UEFA European Under-21 Championship.

A few months later, on 29 August, he was called up to Joachim Löw's senior squad for UEFA Euro 2020 qualifiers against Netherlands and Czech Republic. He made his Germany national football team debut on 9 October 2019 in a friendly against Argentina. He started the game and played the whole match. He scored his first goal on 7 October 2020, against Turkey in a friendly game.

Personal life
Luca Waldschmidt is the son of Wolfgang Waldschmidt, who made 14 appearances for SV Darmstadt 98 in the 1983–84 2. Bundesliga season.

Career statistics

Club

International

As of match played 11 November 2020. Scores and results list Germany's goal tally first.

Honours
Germany U21
UEFA European Under-21 Championship runner-up: 2019

Individual
 UEFA European Under-21 Championship Golden Boot: 2019
 UEFA European Under-21 Championship Team of the Tournament: 2019

References

External links

 Profile at the VfL Wolfsburg website
 
 
 
 

1996 births
Living people
Sportspeople from Siegen
German footballers
Footballers from North Rhine-Westphalia
Germany youth international footballers
Association football forwards
Eintracht Frankfurt players
Eintracht Frankfurt II players
Hamburger SV players
SC Freiburg players
S.L. Benfica footballers
VfL Wolfsburg players
Bundesliga players
Regionalliga players
Primeira Liga players
Germany under-21 international footballers
Germany international footballers
German expatriate footballers
German expatriate sportspeople in Portugal
Expatriate footballers in Portugal